Fíne is a Gaelic-Irish feminine given name.

At least two women named Fín or Fíne are attested in the Irish annals:

 Fín, princess of Cenél nEógain, wife of Oswiu of Northumbria (d. 670).
 Fíne, abatissa or banabb of Kildare.

References

  http://medievalscotland.org/kmo/AnnalsIndex/Feminine/Fine.shtml

Irish-language feminine given names